This is a list of episodes from the eighth season of Happy Days.

Main cast
 Henry Winkler as Arthur "Fonzie" Fonzarelli
 Marion Ross as Marion Cunningham
 Anson Williams as Warren "Potsie" Weber
 Erin Moran as Joanie Cunningham
 Al Molinaro as Alfred "Al" Delvecchio
 Scott Baio as Chachi Arcola
 Lynda Goodfriend as Lori Beth Allen Cunningham
 Tom Bosley as Howard Cunningham

Guest stars
 Cathy Silvers as Jenny Piccalo
 Ted McGinley as Roger Phillips 
 Ellen Travolta as Louisa Arcola 
Denis Mandel as Eugene Belvin
Harris Kal as Bobby
Kevin Sullivan as Tommy

Broadcast history
The season aired Tuesdays at 8:00-8:30 pm (EST).

Episodes

References

Happy Days 08
1980 American television seasons
1981 American television seasons